Greatest Hits is a compilation album released by female music trio Wilson Phillips. It is the group's first official Greatest Hits album (some budget compilations had been released previously). The group broke up in 1993, and did not reunite for this release until 2001. The liner notes features track-by-track commentaries by Carnie Wilson and Wendy Wilson.

The compilation includes all eight singles of their first two albums, as well as the 1991 non-album Elton John cover of "Daniel" which, although not released as a single, peaked at number seven in the Billboard Adult Contemporary chart. Most of the songs are included with the Radio edit versions, which hadn't been included yet on a Wilson Phillips album.

The compilation also includes solo material from the trio after they broke up, Chynna Phillips' single "Naked and Sacred", from her 1995 debut album of the same name, and two songs from the 1997 album The Wilsons, featuring Carnie and Wendy. The album is completed with some rare B-side only live songs, as well as a 1991 interview with the group which was included as the b-side of their single "You're in Love".

Track listing

"Hold On" (Single Edit) 		
"You Won't See Me Cry" (LP Version) 		
"You're in Love" (Single/Radio Edit) 		
"Impulsive" (Single Edit) 		
"Give It Up" (New Extended Radio 7") 		
"Release Me" (Radio Edit) 		
"The Dream Is Still Alive" (AC Remix) 		
"Flesh and Blood" (Single Edit) 		
"Daniel" (LP Version) 		
"A Conversation With Wilson Phillips" 		
"Hotel California" (Live in Japan) 		
"Hold On" (Live in Japan) 		
"Naked and Sacred" (LP Version) (Chynna Phillips) 		
"Miracle" (LP Version) (The Wilsons)		
"Everything I Need" (LP Version) (The Wilsons)

References

Wilson Phillips albums
2000 greatest hits albums
Albums produced by Glen Ballard
Albums produced by Rick Nowels
Albums produced by Brian Wilson
Albums produced by David A. Stewart